Grace Lynde Meigs Crowder (August 30, 1881 – January 20, 1925) was an American physician who studied infant and maternal mortality. She did early comparisons with the data from other countries and she discovered that childbirth was one of the major causes of death in younger American women.

Life
Meigs was born in Rock Island, Illinois, on August 30, 1881. Her parents were Montgomery Meigs, a civil engineer, and his wife Grace Lynde. Meigs had five sisters, one of whom, Cornelia Meigs, became a noted author.

Meigs was educated at Keokuk High School, before attending Bryn Mawr College, Pennsylvania, where she participated in collegiate athletics. She graduated from Bryn Mawr in 1903 with honors. From 1904 to 1905, Meigs attended Keokuk Medical College, followed from 1905 to 1908 by study at Rush Medical College, which at that time was affiliated with the University of Chicago. Meigs graduated from Rush first in her class. During her final two years at Rush, she spent considerable time at the Presbyterian Hospital. Meigs gained top marks in the competitive examination for interns at Cook County Hospital, Illinois. Her grade average was 87.91, ahead of the second placed student who had an average grade of 81.77. Meigs had been the only woman to sit the examination, and, after Anna Blount, was the second woman to attain top marks.

Now a medical doctor, Meigs travelled to Europe for post-graduate studies in Germany and Austria. After two years of study abroad, Meigs became attending physician at the Cook County Hospital.

In 1915, Meigs was recruited by Julia Lathrop, chief of the Children's Bureau of the U.S. Department of Labor, to become the first director of the Child Hygiene Division. There Meigs oversaw research on infant and maternal mortality. In 1917, she authored a study of childbirth-related maternal mortality, collating data from the United States as well as other countries. Her research found that women's deaths from pregnancy and childbirth-related issues had not decreased in the years between 1890 and 1913, a finding counter to the prevailing opinion of physicians at the time. This was the first study which compared infant mortality in the United States to that in other countries. The study found that, after tuberculosis, childbirth was the second-most common cause of death of women aged 15 to 45 years.

Meigs was a proponent of mothers remaining at home with their children; she wrote:

Meigs' 1917 report on maternal mortality was influential in the US, and led to the development of services for pregnant women and nursing mothers, the increased establishment of obstetric facilities, and the passing of the Sheppard–Towner Act. During her career, Meigs served on the Commission on Infant Welfare, and was a member of the General Medical Board and the Council of National Defense.

Meigs continued as Director of the Division of Hygiene until July 15, 1918, a few months prior to her marriage on September 9, 1918, to Thomas Reid Crowder, a fellow physician, in Keokuk, Iowa. She was his second wife; they had three children, Alice Meigs, Juliet Reid and Thomas Reid Jr.

Meigs died on January 20, 1925, in Chicago.

Works

References 

American public health doctors
20th-century American women physicians
20th-century American physicians
Bryn Mawr College alumni
Rush Medical College alumni
People from Rock Island, Illinois
Physicians from Illinois
1881 births
1925 deaths
Women public health doctors